The Collegium of Manufacturing (Manufaktur-kollegia; also College) was an executive body in the Russian Empire from 1722, when the Collegium of Mining and Manufacturing split into two.

Collegia of the Russian Empire
1722 establishments in the Russian Empire